This is a list of women writers who were born in Denmark or  whose writings are closely associated with that country.

A
Karen Aabye (1904–1982), journalist and historical novelist
Jane Aamund (1936–2019), novelist and journalist
Merete Ahnfeldt-Mollerup (born 1963), works on architecture
Naja Marie Aidt (born 1963), poet, novelist and short story writer
Laura Aller (1849–1917), editor and pioneering magazine publisher at Aller
Annemette Kure Andersen (born 1962), widely translated poet
Clara Andersen (1826–1895), playwright and short story writer 
Ellen Andersen (1898–1989), museum curator and textile specialist
Emilie Andersen (1895–1970), historian and archivist
Signe Arnfred (born 1944), sociologist specializing in gender studies
Inga Arvad (1913–1973), journalist

B
Charlotte Baden (1740–1824), novelist and feminist writer
Jette Baagøe (born 1946), museum director, botanist and non-fiction writer
Solvej Balle (born 1962), novelist and poet
Regitze Barner (1834–1911), philanthropist and writer
Rigmor Stampe Bendix (1850–1923), baroness, writer and philanthropist
 Dorothea Biehl (1731–1788), playwright
Susan Binau (born 1964), motivational writings on illness and dying
Louise Bjørnsen (1824–1899), novelist and short story writer
Jenny Blicher-Clausen (1865–1907), poet and playwright
Karen Blixen (1885–1962), novelist and memoirist, including Out of Africa
Sara Blædel (born 1964), crime-fiction novelist
Cecil Bødker (1927–2020), young-adult fiction
Sophia Brahe (1556–1643), wrote the genealogy of Danish noble families
Marie Bregendahl (1867–1940), novelist and writer of realistic rural literature
Suzanne Brøgger (born 1944), novelist and journalist
Therese Brummer (1833–1896), children's writer, biographer
Friederike Brun (1765–1835), poet and travel writer
Anne Bruun (1853–1934), women's rights activist and editor of Kvinden og Samfundet
Tine Bryld (1939–2011), novelist
Julia Butschkow (born 1978), playwright and poet

C
Franziska Carlsen (1817–1876), writer documenting local history and folklore
Esther Carstensen (1873–1955), women's rights activist and journal editor
Mimi Carstensen (1852–1935), philanthropist, journalist and magazine editor
Inger Christensen (1935–2009), poet, novelist and essayist
Leonora Christine (1621–1698), writer of memoirs, Denmark's first known woman writer
Bente Clod (born 1946), poet, novelist and children's writer
Hedvig Collin (1880–1964), painter, illustrator and children's writer

D
Ulla Dahlerup (born 1942), journalist, writer and women's rights activist
Tove Ditlevsen (1917–1976), poet, novelist and short story writer
Emmy Drachmann (1854–1928), novelist

E
Elsebeth Egholm (born 1960), popular crime-fiction author and TV screenwriter
Charlotte Eilersgaard (1858–1922), novelist, playwright and women's rights activist
Katrine Engberg (born 1975), novelist and actress
Merete Erbou Laurent (born 1949), weaver, textile artist and magazine editor
Inge Eriksen (1935–2015), novelist, science fiction, poet and political activist

F
Astrid Stampe Feddersen (1852–1930), writings in support of women's rights
Elfride Fibiger (1832–1911), novelist, short story writer and women's emancipation activist
Ilia Fibiger (1817–1867), playwright, novelist and Denmark's first professional nurse
Mathilde Fibiger (1830–1872), writings in support of women's rights
Hanne Finsen (born 1925), art historian
Kate Fleron (1909–2006), journal editor and resistance member
Lone Frank (born 1966), journalist and non-fiction writer
Kirstine Frederiksen (1845–1903), pedagogue, writer and women's rights advocate
Astrid Friis (1893–1966), historian and journal editor

G
Emma Gad (1852–1921), playwright and non-fiction writer
Suzanne Giese (1946–2012), writer and women's rights activist
Henny Glarbo (1884–1955), archivist
Luise Gramm (1746–1824), letter writer
Elsa Gress (1919–1988), essayist, novelist and dramatist
Anna Grue (born 1957), crime novelist
Thomasine Gyllembourg (1773–1856), novelist

H
Marie Hammer (1907–2002), zoologist
Henriette Hanck (1807–1846), poet and novelist
Lise Hannestad (born 1943), classical scholar and archaeologist
Bente Hansen (1940–2022), writer, editor and women's rights activist
Eva Hemmer Hansen (1913–1983), journalist, novelist, translator and feminist
Lise Bach Hansen (fl. 2000s), curator, Royal Danish Library
Kirsten Hastrup (born 1948), anthropologist
Bettina Hauge (born 1964), anthropologist
Louise Hegermann-Lindencrone (1778–1853), novelist and short story writer
Annette Heick (born 1971), journalist
Johanne Luise Heiberg (1812–1890), writer of memoirs
Julie Heins (1822–1902), schoolteacher and reading book writer
Dyveke Helsted (1919–2005), art historian, museum director
Agnes Henningsen (1868–1962), novelist, short story writer and women's rights activist
Dagmar Hjort (1860–1902), educator and rights activist
Greta Hort born Grethe Hjort (1903–1967), professor of Danish and English literature
Anne Holm (1922–1998), children's writer and journalist
Hanne-Vibeke Holst (born 1959), journalist and novelist
Ellen Hørup (1871–1953), journalist and non-fiction writer on peace and women's rights
Annelise Hovmand (1924–2016), screenwriter
Anna Hude (1858–1934), historian

J
Lis Jacobsen (1882–1961), philologist and historian
Kristine Marie Jensen (1858–1923), early cookbook writer
Thit Jensen (1876–1957), novelist, playwright and short story writer involved in women's rights
Thyra Jensen (1865–1949), short story writer, biographer and women's rights activist
Ellen Jørgensen (1877–1948), historian
Erna Juel-Hansen (1845–1922), novelist, short story writer, feminist and educator
Teckla Juel (1834–1904), novelist, short story writer and composer of songs

K
Anne Krabbe (1552–1618), estate owner and writer
Lene Kaaberbøl (born 1960), children's writer and crime fiction writer
Janina Katz (1938–2013), Polish-born Danish poet, novelist and children's writer
Lene Koch (born 1947), gender studies researcher and historian
Nynne Koch (1915–2001), novelist, autobiographer and gender studies researcher
Birgithe Kosovic (born 1972), journalist and autobiographer on Yugoslavia

L
Margrethe Lasson (1659–1738), author of Denmark's first novel
Cornelia von Levetzow (1836–1921), popular novelist
Mette Lisby (born 1968), writer, actress, comedian and television host, now in the United States
Anna Christiane Ludvigsen (1794–1884), poet from Southern Jutland
Bodil Jerslev Lund (1919–2005), Danish chemist and educator
Hulda Lütken (1896–1946), poet and novelist

M
Anne Marie Mangor (1781–1865), early cookbook writer
Alfhilda Mechlenburg (1830–1907), novelist and short story writer
Karin Michaëlis (1872–1950), journalist, novelist and children's writer
Else Holmelund Minarik (1920–2012), U.S. immigrant author of the Little Bear series of children's books
Johanne Meyer (1838–1915), pioneering Danish suffragist, pacifist, journal editor and writer
Eva Moltesen (1871–1934), Finnish-Danish writer and peace activist 
Else Moltke (1888–1986), writer on historical figures
Herdis Møllehave (1936–2001), social worker and novelist
Dea Trier Mørch (1941–2001), novelist and writer on women and childbirth
Johanne Münter (1844–1921), writer and women's rights activist
Elna Mygdal (1868–1940), textile researcher, museum director and writer

N
Bodil Neergaard (1867–1959), landowner, philanthropist and memoirist
Henriette Nielsen (1815–1900), novelist and playwright
Maria Nielsen (1882–1931), historian and educator
Lise Nørgaard (1917–2023), novelist, screenwriter and author of TV series Matador
Marianne Nøhr Larsen (born 1963), anthropologist and writer
Louise Nyholm Kallestrup (born 1975), historian

O
Olivia Levison, (1847–1894), author and writer
Annette K. Olesen (born 1965), screenwriter
Voldborg Ølsgaard (1877–1939), editor of Fred og Frihed
Tania Ørum (born 1945), literary historian, gender studies specialist
Elise Otté (1818–1903), Anglo-Danish philologist and historian

P
Hortense Panum (1856–1933), music historian
Sophie Petersen (1885–1965), geographer
Louise von Plessen (1725–1799), court memoirist
Birgitte Possing (born 1952), historian, biographer and feminist

Q
Hedevig Quiding (1867–1936), opera singer, music critic, journalist, educator
Anne Margrethe Qvitzow (1652–1700), poet, translator and memoirist

R
Ingeborg Raunkiær (1863–1921), novelist and article writer
Olga Ravn (born 1986), poet and novelist
Adda Ravnkilde (1862–1883), Danish novelists
Frederikke Charlotte Reventlow (1747–1822), countess, author and letter writer
Julie Reventlow (1763–1816), salonnière and non-fiction writer
Jytte Rex (born 1942), novelist and writer on women's rights
Ane Riel (born 1971), novelist and winner of the Glass Key award
Ivan Ring, pen name of Alfhilda Mechlenburg (1830–1907)
Signe Rink (1836–1909), Greenland-born Danish writer and ethnologist
Anna-Grethe Rischel (born 1935), paper historian
Edith Rode (1879–1956), novelist and journalist
Else Roesdahl (born 1942), historian and specialist on Vikings
Caja Rude (1884–1949), novelist and women's rights activist

S
Astrid Saalbach (born 1955), playwright and novelist
Vibeke Salicath (1861–1921), philanthropist, feminist, politician and women's journal editor
Lotte Salling (born 1964), children's writer
Else Kai Sass (1912–1987), art historian
 Bente Scavenius (born 1944), art critic and author
Rikke Schubart (born 1966), novelist and writer on film and television
Alba Schwartz (1857–1942), novelist
Ingeborg Maria Sick (1858–1951), novelist and biographer
Birte Siim (born 1945), political scientist specializing in gender studies
Sanne Søndergaard (born 1980), novelist and stand-up comedian
Anna Louise Stevnhøj (born 1963), non-fiction writer on children and health
Maria Engelbrecht Stokkenbech (1759–after 1806), feminist and autobiographer
Fanny Suenssen (1832–1918), novelist and short story writer
Hanne Marie Svendsen (born 1933), non-fiction writer and novelist
Karen Syberg (born 1945), writer, gender researcher and feminist

T
Pia Tafdrup (born 1952), poet
Janne Teller (born 1964), philosophical novelist
Mette Thomsen (born 1970), novelist
Magdalene Thoresen (1819–1903), Danish-born Norwegian poet and novelist
 Kirsten Thorup (born 1942), novelist, poet and screenwriter
Eleonora Tscherning (1817–1890), memoirist and painter
Fanny Tuxen (1832–1906), children's writer

U
Leonora Christina Ulfeldt (1621–1698), autobiographer

V
Vibeke Vasbo (born 1944), novelist, poet, women's activist and former member of Danish Lesbian Movement

W
Emilie West (1844–1907), schoolteacher and needlework proponent
Lise Warburg (born 1932), textile artist and writer
Dorrit Willumsen (born 1940), poet, novelist and short story writer
Pauline Worm (1825–1883), writer, poet, schoolteacher and feminist

References

See also
List of Faroese women writers
List of Danish writers
List of women writers

-
Danish women writers, List of
Writers
Women writers, List of Danish